Newnham Castle was a medieval castle in the village of Newnham, Kent, England.

History
Newnham Castle was built by the Normans, probably by Fulk de Newenham in the mid-12th century during the civil war known as the Anarchy. The castle was located on a scarp to the north of the village and comprised a motte and bailey design. Once built, a mound was piled up around the tower to produce the motte, in a similar fashion to that seen at Farnham.

See also
 Castles in Great Britain and Ireland
 List of castles in England

References

Bibliography

External links
 Summer interim

Castles in Kent